The Casa Grande del Pueblo (English: Great House of the People), is the Bolivian presidential residence that replaced the Palacio Quemado in 2018. Inaugurated on 9 August 2018 during the presidency of Evo Morales as the official residence of the President of Bolivia, the interim government of Jeanine Áñez reverted to occupying the Palacio Quemado from 2019 to 2020. Following the inauguration of Luis Arce on 8 November 2020, it has again become the residence of the president.

History

Planning 
The proposal for the tower was initially declined due to municipal height restrictions in the historical district, with La Paz's mayoral office saying that the Land Use and Settlement Patterns prohibited such buildings, with spokesperson Luis Lugones stating "If the government wants to build a 10 or 12-story palace, that would be prohibited". Allies of President Evo Morales in the Plurinational Legislative Assembly assisted with bypassing the law, however, permitting the tower's construction. 

Controversy surrounded the location of the tower's proposed site, Casa Alencastre, a former residence of the archbishop that was built in 1821, before the creation of the Bolivian state. Cultural and historical groups opposed the destruction of Casa Alencastre. The historical building was ultimately demolished.

Casa Grande del Pueblo was inaugurated by Morales on 9 August 2018 and cost $34 million.

Design and features 

In the lobby, a mural of Pachamama created by Roberto Mamani Mamani is featured while an archway displays 36 faces, half man and half woman, representing the 36 recognized indigenous groups of Bolivia. On the exterior, three symbols are displayed representing the three climate zones of Bolivia; the Andes, the basins of the mountains and the lowlands.

The building features a helipad and the top two floors were reserved for the president, featuring a gym, spa and private elevator. A sitting room was decorated with a painting that had multiple portraits of world politicians, including Nelson Mandela and Fidel Castro.

References

Government buildings in Bolivia
Government of Bolivia
Buildings and structures in La Paz
Presidential residences
Buildings and structures in La Paz Department (Bolivia)